Ryszard Gawior (born 18 September 1943) was a Polish luger who competed in the late 1960s. He won a bronze medal in the men's doubles event at the 1967 FIL European Luge Championships in Königssee, West Germany.

Gawior also finished sixth in the men's doubles event at the 1968 Winter Olympics in Grenoble.

References
List of European luge champions 
Wallechinsky, David. (1984). "Luge - Men's two-seater". The Complete Book of the Olympics: 1896-1980. New York: Penguin Books. p. 576.
Ryszard Gawior's profile at Sports Reference.com

1943 births
Living people
Lugers at the 1968 Winter Olympics
Lugers at the 1972 Winter Olympics
Olympic lugers of Poland
Polish male lugers
Sportspeople from Kielce